The Diocese of New Westminster is one of five dioceses of the Ecclesiastical Province of British Columbia and the Yukon of the Anglican Church of Canada. The see city is Vancouver. The current bishop is the Right Reverend John Stephens. He was consecrated as the coadjutor bishop on January 23, 2021, and installed as diocesan bishop on February 28, 2021. The Dean of New Westminster and rector of the cathedral (Christ Church Cathedral) is the Very Reverend Christopher Pappas and the Executive Archdeacon of the diocese is the Venerable G. Douglas Fenton. Archdeacon Fenton has announced that he will retire, January 4, 2023.

The diocese encompasses about 78,000 square kilometres of the Lower Mainland in the civil province of British Columbia, comprising the Regional Districts of Metro Vancouver, Fraser Valley, Sunshine Coast, Powell River and part of the Regional District of Squamish-Lillooet (including  Squamish and Whistler).

The diocese was founded in New Westminster in 1879, but with the considerable growth of the City of Vancouver, the see city was moved there in 1912. There are, therefore, two churches styled as "cathedrals" in the diocese — Christ Church Cathedral in Vancouver has been the cathedral since 1929, while Holy Trinity Cathedral in New Westminster was the cathedral from 1892 to that date. Although no longer a cathedral, the diocesan synod allowed Holy Trinity to keep the title "cathedral" as a courtesy for historical reasons (it is, strictly speaking, a pro-cathedral).

The diocese has 63 active parishes and 3 emerging faith communities with approximately 18,000 members on its parish rolls according to the recent statistics stated in the official publication Topic.

The diocese has traditionally been at the forefront of progressive causes in the Anglican Communion. In 1976, David Somerville was one of the first bishops of the Canadian Church to ordain women. In 2002, the diocese became the centre of an international controversy within the Anglican Communion due to its decision to bless same-sex unions. Several conservative ecclesiastical provinces in the communion, particularly those in Africa, have severed relations with the diocese over the issue (see Homosexuality and the Anglican Communion).

At the May 11, 2016, meeting of the diocesan council the governing body of the diocese unanimously passed the following motion:
That Diocesan Council, on behalf of the Diocese of New Westminster:
I.	Accept the invitation of the Episcopal Diocese of Northern Philippines to enter into a companion relationship seeking opportunities for prayer, mutual learning, and witness to the gospel (the "Companion Relationship");
II.	undertake an annual evaluation of the Companion Relationship to ensure that the Companion Relationship satisfies the mutual goals of the two dioceses (the "Annual Evaluations"); and
III.	ask the Bishop to appoint members from the Diocese of New Westminster to a joint-diocesan working group to oversee the Companion Relationship and to undertake the Annual Evaluations. Bishop Brent Alawas of the Episcopal Diocese of Northern Philippines travelled from Bontoc to Vancouver on May 12, 2016 and was present as a guest speaker at the diocesan mission conference on May 14, 2016

The diocesan offices, gathering space, meeting rooms and archives are located at 1410 Nanton Avenue in the Shaughnessy section of the City of Vancouver.

Coat of arms and badge
The coat of arms and badge are both official marks for the diocese. In practice, the crest is generally used more when the bishop is involved directly, and the badge when specifically referencing only the diocese.

The coat of arms, with much history behind it, was acquired by Bishop Gower in 1960. It strongly references that of Westminster Abbey, London, UK.

The badge (a blue circle, gold cross and birds over white wave) was created for the diocesan communications committee with the help of Robert Watt, Chief Herald of Canada, and officially adopted at the 2007 diocesan synod.

The badge is a proper heraldic symbol for use on diocesan and parish materials. It incorporates key elements of the diocesan coat of arms, but is less detailed, and the badge is easier to reproduce properly than the very detailed coat of arms.

Bishops of New Westminster

See also

 Peter Elliott (Canadian priest)
 Sir Francis Heathcote, 9th Baronet

Bibliography

External links
Official website

Religious organizations established in 1879
New Westminster
New Westminster
Christianity in Vancouver
1879 establishments in British Columbia
Anglican Province of British Columbia and Yukon